Appius Claudius Pulcher may refer to:

 Appius Claudius Pulcher (consul 212 BC)
 Appius Claudius Pulcher (consul 185 BC)
 Appius Claudius Pulcher (consul 143 BC)
 Appius Claudius Pulcher (consul 79 BC)
 Appius Claudius Pulcher (consul 54 BC)
 Appius Claudius Pulcher (consul 38 BC)